Eddie's Head is a box set by Iron Maiden, in the shape of the head of their mascot, Eddie and containing their first 12 albums remastered, from Iron Maiden to Live at Donington, each with bonus multimedia material, plus a limited In Profile CD. The spine of each CD has a part of the original cover art for Iron Maiden.

This set has been out of print for years, prompting the price to skyrocket. However, all of the individual CDs that make up the box set have all been reissued on their own, making them easily attainable.

Track listing

Disc: 1 (Iron Maiden)

Disc: 2 (Killers)

Disc: 3 (The Number of the Beast)

Disc: 4 (Piece of Mind)

Disc: 5 (Powerslave)

Disc: 6 (Live After Death)

Disc: 7 (Live After Death)

Disc: 8 (Somewhere in Time)

Disc: 9 (Seventh Son of a Seventh Son)

Disc: 10 (No Prayer for the Dying)

Disc: 11 (Fear of the Dark)

Disc: 12 (A Real Dead One)

Disc: 13 (A Real Live One)

Disc: 14 (Live at Donington)

Disc: 15 (Live at Donington)

Disc: 16 (In Profile)
Written and narrated by Mike Hurst. Features excerpts of various songs, and interviews with Steve Harris, Dave Murray, Rod Smallwood and Blaze Bayley.

Personnel 

Blaze Bayley - vocals (disc 16)
Martin Birch – producer, engineer, mixing (discs 2–11)
Albert Boekholt – assistant engineer
Clive Burr – drums (discs 1–3)
Sean Burrows – assistant engineer
George Chin – photography
Paul Di'Anno – vocals (discs 1–2)
Bruce Dickinson – vocals (discs 3–15)
Robert Ellis – photography
Paul Foster – executive producer
Simon Fowler – photography
Janick Gers – guitar (discs 10–15)
Frank Gibson – assistant engineer
Hugh Gilmour – art direction, reissue design
Nigel Green – engineer
Ross Halfin – photography
Denis Haliburton – assistant engineer
Steve Harris – bass, vocals (discs 1–15); producer, mixing (discs 11–15)
Simon Heyworth – remastering
Mike Hurst – narrator, liner notes (disc 16)
Guido Karp – photography
Michael Kenney – keyboards (discs 9–15)
Martin Levan – engineer
Will Malone – producer (disc 1)
George Marino – mastering
Nicko McBrain - drums (discs 4–15)
Mick McKenna – engineer, assistant engineer
Tony Mottram – photography
Dave Murray – guitar (discs 1–15)
Denis O'Regan – photography
Ronald Prent – assistant engineer
Derek Riggs – cover illustration, sleeve design, sleeve idea (discs 1–15)
Gus Shaw – mastering
Rod Smallwood – photography, concept, sleeve design, sleeve idea
Adrian Smith – guitar, vocals (discs 2–9, 15)
Dennis Stratton – guitar, vocals (disc 1)
Stephane "The Vardengrip" Wissner – engineer
Roger Woodhead – executive producer
Tim Young – mastering
Sarah 'Polly' Polglase - project manager E-CDs

References 

Iron Maiden compilation albums
1998 compilation albums
Heavy metal compilation albums